SRiX (SR Innovation Exchange) is a Technology Business Incubator (TBI) located in Warangal, Telangana. The incubator was inaugurated by Telangana IT & Panchayat Raj Minister K. T. Rama Rao on 5 March 2018.

Campus
SRiX is located in SR Engineering College campus in Warangal. It is supported by the Department of Science & Technology (DST) and Government of India to accelerate the startup eco-system.

References 

Economy of Telangana
Business incubators of India